The Grammy Award for Best Jazz Vocal Performance, Male was an honor presented at the Grammy Awards, a ceremony that was established in 1958 and originally called the Gramophone Awards, to male recording artists for quality jazz vocal performances (songs or albums). Honors in several categories are presented at the ceremony annually by the National Academy of Recording Arts and Sciences of the United States to "honor artistic achievement, technical proficiency and overall excellence in the recording industry, without regard to album sales or chart position".

Prior to 1981, the gender-neutral category of Best Jazz Vocal Performance existed. The first award specifically for male performances was presented to George Benson in 1981 for the song "Moody's Mood". The category remained unchanged until 1985, when it was combined with the award for Best Jazz Vocal Performance, Female and presented in the genderless category. Gender-specific awards were once again presented from 1986 until 1991. In 1992, the two categories were combined and presented as the category Best Jazz Vocal Performance. This category was later renamed to Best Jazz Vocal Album beginning in 2001. While the gender-specific award has not been presented since the category merge in 1992, an official confirmation of its retirement has not been announced.

Bobby McFerrin holds the record for the most wins in this category, with a total of four consecutive wins from 1986 to 1989 (once along with Jon Hendricks). Mel Tormé and Harry Connick, Jr. each received the award twice. An American artist received the award each year it was presented. Tormé holds the record for the most nominations, with six. Mark Murphy and Joe Williams hold the record for the most nominations without a win, with a total of four each.

Recipients

 Each year is linked to the article about the Grammy Awards held that year.
 Award was combined with the Best Jazz Vocal Performance, Female category and presented in a genderless category known as Best Jazz Vocal Performance.

See also

 Grammy Award for Best Jazz Vocal Performance, Duo or Group
 List of Grammy Award categories

References

General
 

Specific

External links
Official site of the Grammy Awards

 
1981 establishments in the United States
1991 disestablishments in the United States
Awards established in 1981
Awards disestablished in 1991
Jazz Vocal Performance, Male
Jazz Vocal Performance, Male
Vocal Performance, Male